Frank Holliday (born 1957, North Carolina) is an American painter who became known in the New York City art world in the 1970s and 1980s. He is often associated with the East Village scene and associated with Club 57. His early career as an artist included working with Andy Warhol and close associations with artists such as Keith Haring Ann Magnuson and Kenny Scharf.

He is a member of the faculty of Parsons, the New School for Design, in New York City.

Solo exhibitions
 2006 Paintings on Paper Tintenets Gallery Beacon, NY
 2003 New Paintings Kenny Schachter ConTEMPorary, NYC
 2001 Trippin' In America Debs & Co., NYC
 1999 Rafa Series Debs & Co., NYC
 1998 New Paintings Samuel Manache, Mexico City, Mexico
 1997 Wah Wah Series Debs & Co., NYC
 1997 Eclipse The Kitchen, NYC
 1994 Paintings Dru Arstark Gallery, NYC
 1993 Inside/OutGAL Gallery, NC
 1990 New Paintings Tom Cugliani Gallery, NYC
 1989 New Paintings Tom Cugliani Gallery, NYC
 1987 New Paintings Tom Cugliani Gallery, NYC

Catalogs

 2004 Biannua IEssay by Michael Braake
 2002 With Or Without YouEssay by Royce Smith
 2001 Tripping in AmericaEssay by Elizabeth Murray, Debs & Co.
 Figure/Disfigure Essay by J. Toinick, URI
 1999 Wah Wah Series Essay by Anney Bonney, Nick Debs
 No Show Essay by Dale Peck, Nick Debs
 1986 Correspondences Essay by N. Mouforrage

Bibliography
 2009 New York Observer, The Gallery Is Fake, But the Paintings Are Real, By Leon Neyfakh
 2007 The New York Times Holland Cotter
 2004 Gay City News "Queering MoMA", a panel discussion with artists "Frank Holliday", Carrie Moyer, Stephen Mueller, Sheila Pepe and Andrew Cornell Robinson.
 2003 Art Net March Walter Robinson
 2003 Gay City News March 23, 2003, Mick Meehan
 2002 Art in America January 1, 2003
 2001 The New Yorker October 23, 2001
 2001 The New York Times November 2, 2001, Review by Ken Johnson
 2000 Art Issues January 10, 2000, Review by David Humphrey
 2000 Absolute ArtBook
 1999 The New Yorker Pick
 1999 New York Magazine Pick
 1998 Excélsior Mexico City
 1998 Novedades Mexico City
 1998 El Reforma Mexico City
 1997 The New York Times Review by Ken Johnson
 1997 The New Yorker Pick
 1997 New York Magazine Pick
 1997 Art In America Holland Cotter
 1990 The New Yorker Pick
 1989 Art In America Review 
 1989 Native New Yorker Review by David Hirsh
 1988 Juliet Spray International Survey
 1984 The New York Times The Beast by Grace Glueck
 1984 Flash Art East Village By N. Moufourrage

Grants
 2015 Guggenheim Fellowship
 2010 Pollock Krasner Foundation Fellowship
 2010 Gottlieb Foundation Fellowship
 1986 National Endowment for the Arts

Collections
 Weatherspoon Museum
 Museum Frederick Russe, Stockholm Sweden
 Miniature Museum, Amsterdam, Netherlands

Education
 BFA: School of Visual Arts 1979
 San Francisco Art Institute
 New York Studio School

References

External links 
 Official website
 Club 57 exhibition at the Museum of Modern Art, with a video of Frank Holliday talking about the work and experiences from the club
 Review of Frank Holliday's recent show, titled "Trippin' in America," Art in America, Feb, 2002 
 Article about Frank Holliday's work that he did for a film in 2009
 "Queering MoMA", a panel discussion and conversation with artists Frank Holliday, Carrie Moyer, Stephen Mueller, Sheila Pepe and Andrew Cornell Robinson.
 Article about Frank Holliday's award of the Gottlieb and Pollock-Krasner grants

20th-century American painters
American male painters
21st-century American painters
21st-century American male artists
Living people
American LGBT artists
1957 births
People from Greensboro, North Carolina
Painters from North Carolina
LGBT people from North Carolina
20th-century American male artists